The Jar of Xerxes I is a jar in calcite or alabaster, an alabastron, with the quadrilingual signature of Achaemenid ruler Xerxes I (ruled 486–465 BC), which was discovered in the ruins of the Mausoleum at Halicarnassus, in Caria, modern Turkey, at the foot of the western staircase. It is now in the British Museum, though not currently on display.

Description
The jar contains the same short inscription in Old Persian, Egyptian, Babylonian, and Elamite:

The function of this jar is not well known. It may have contained some of the water from the Nile, received as a symbol of submission. A few other examples of broadly similar jars are known throughout the Achaemenid Empire, including jar from Darius I. The jar may have been part of the collection of the Carian Satrap, and testifies to the close contacts between Carian rulers and the Achaemenid Empire. 

The vases, of Egyptian origin, were very precious to the Achaemenids, and may therefore have been offered by Xerxes to Carian rulers, and then kept as a precious object. In particular, the precious jar may have been offered by Xerxes to the Carian dynast Artemisia I, who had acted with merit as his only female Admiral during the Second Persian invasion of Greece, and particularly at the Battle of Salamis.

The Jar is located in the British Museum. Its height is 28.8 centimetres, its diameter 12.8 centimetres at the rim. It was excavated by Charles Thomas Newton in 1857.

Similar jars
A few similar alabaster jar exist, from the time of Darius I to Xerxes, and to some later Achaemenid rulers, especially Artaxerxes I.

See also
 History of Achaemenid Egypt
 List of Iranian artifacts abroad

References

Middle Eastern objects in the British Museum
Archaeology of the Achaemenid Empire
Xerxes I
Archaeological discoveries in Turkey
Achaemenid inscriptions
Akkadian inscriptions
Elamite language
Alabaster
1857 archaeological discoveries
1857 in the Ottoman Empire
Egyptian inscriptions
Achaemenid Anatolia
Caria